Daniel Simmes (born 12 August 1966 in Dortmund) is a German football manager and former professional player.

Managerial career
In March 2013 Simmes became assistant manager at Lierse.

In September 2014, he was announced manager of Lierse's women team.

Honours
 Goal of the Year (Germany): 1984

References

External links
 

1966 births
Living people
Association football forwards
German footballers
Germany under-21 international footballers
Germany youth international footballers
Bundesliga players
Borussia Dortmund players
Karlsruher SC players
Lierse S.K. players
Alemannia Aachen players
Wuppertaler SV players
German expatriate footballers
Expatriate footballers in Belgium
German expatriate sportspeople in Belgium
German expatriate football managers
Expatriate football managers in Belgium
Footballers from Dortmund